The 2019 Women's Ford National Hockey League was the 21st and final edition of the women's field hockey tournament. The competition was held in Tauranga, New Zealand between 14–22 September.

North Harbour won the title for the fifth time, equalling the record for most wins previously set by Auckland. The team defeated Northland 2–0 in the final. Canterbury finished in third place after defeating Central 2–1.

In 2020, the tournament will be replaced by the Premier Hockey League.

Participating teams
The following eight teams competed for the title:

 Auckland
 Canterbury
 Capital
 Central
 Midlands
 Northland
 North Harbour
 Southern

Results

Preliminary round

Pool A

Pool B

Second round

Pool C (Medal Round)

Pool D (Classification Round)

Classification

Seventh and eighth place

Fifth and sixth place

Third and fourth place

Final

Statistics

Final standings

Goalscorers

References

National Hockey League
New Zealand National Hockey League seasons
Women's field hockey in New Zealand
2019 in New Zealand women's sport